Restigouche, deriving from the Míkmaq name Listuguj (in Francis-Smith orthography Listukuj), is the name of several geographic and political features in northern New Brunswick and neighbouring Quebec:

 HMCS Restigouche, two naval vessels 
 Listuguj Mi'gmaq First Nation
 Restigouche (electoral district), a former Canadian federal electoral district
 Restigouche (provincial electoral district), a New Brunswick provincial electoral district
 Madawaska—Restigouche, a Canadian federal electoral district
 Restigouche County, New Brunswick
 Restigouche River
Restigouche, a Míkmaq community in the Gaspe Peninsula of Quebec, Canada, across the Restigouche River from Campbellton, New Brunswick; see Listuguj Mi'gmaq First Nation
 Battle of Restigouche (1760), a naval battle during the French and Indian War

Mi'kmaq